Sari Beygluy-e Cheragh (also Romanized as Sārī Beyglūy-e Cherāgh; also known as Sārī Beyglar-e Cherāgh and Sārī Beyglū-ye Cherāgh) is a village in Nazlu-e Shomali Rural District, Nazlu District, Urmia County, West Azerbaijan Province, Iran. At the 2006 census, its population was 500, in 125 families.

References 

Populated places in Urmia County